Félix Manuel Pérez Miyares (born 1936) is a Spanish politician from the Union of the Democratic Centre (UCD) and later the Democratic and Social Centre (CDS) who served as Minister of Labour from September 1980 to February 1981.

References

1936 births
Living people
Government ministers of Spain
20th-century Spanish politicians
Labour ministers of Spain